The Atomic City is a 1952 thriller film directed by Jerry Hopper and starring Gene Barry and Lydia Clarke.

The story takes place at Los Alamos, New Mexico, where a nuclear physicist (Barry) lives and works. Terrorists kidnap his son and demand that the physicist turn over the H-bomb formula.

The film was nominated for an Academy Award for Best Writing (Story and Screenplay), Sydney Boehm being the nominee.

Plot
Frank and Martha Addison live in Los Alamos, where he does top-secret work as a physicist. They have a young son, Tommy, who goes with school mates to Santa Fe for a carnival with their teacher, Ellen Haskell. During a puppet show he disappears but this is not noticed until his name is announced winner of a raffle for a bicycle at the end of the show.

They await a phone call as they fear something has happened. They receive a ransom note assembled from words from different newspapers. They also get a phone call saying to stay silent.

Ellen's boyfriend is an FBI agent, Russ Farley, and she passes along her concerns. Farley and partner Harold Mann begin tailing the Addisons. When a kidnapper instructs Frank to steal a file from the atomic lab and mail it to a Los Angeles hotel, he wants to inform the authorities, but Martha fears for their boy.

A small-time thief, David Rogers, collects an envelope with the file at a post office, but they alert the FBI who follow him. He goes to a baseball game, followed by the FBI's agents who ask the TV cameras to zoom into him. After the match they are surprised when his car explodes, killing the man. However Rogers no longer has the envelope. The FBI watch the film footage as they presume he has passed the file to someone at the game. Watching the film footage the FBI spots a hot-dog vendor who is actually Donald Clark, a man with Communist ties. The FBI bring him in but are limited in what they can extract. However Dr addison is left in an adjoining room alone. He beats up Clark to ascertain where his son is... in Santa Fe.

Tommy is moved by kidnappers to the Puye Cliff Dwellings in New Mexico, where they briefly encounter the Fentons, a family of tourists. The mastermind turns out to be Dr. Rassett, a physicist. He studies the file Addison mailed and determines it to be a fake. Rassett orders the boy killed, but Tommy has escaped and is hiding in a cave.

The son of the Fentons finds the raffle ticket at the ruins, and back in Santa Fe tries to exchange it for the raffle prize. The area is being watched by the FBI and they ask where the ticket came from, receiving the vital clue to Tommy's whereabouts. FBI agents rush to the site, where Rassett is arrested after killing his accomplices, and Tommy is saved.

Production
This was the film debut for star Gene Barry and director Jerry Hopper. This was the first feature film allowed to be filmed on location in Los Alamos. Filming was also done at the Puye Cliff Dwellings.

Cast
 Gene Barry as Dr. Frank Addison
 Lydia Clarke as Martha Addison
 Michael Moore as Russ Farley
 Nancy Gates as Ellen Haskell
 Lee Aaker as Tommy Addison
 Milburn Stone as Insp. Harold Mann
 Bert Freed as Emil Jablons
 Frank Cady as F.B.I. Agent George Weinberg
 Houseley Stevenson Jr. as 'Greg' Gregson
 Leonard Strong as Donald Clark
 Jerry Hausner as John Pattiz
 John Damler as Dr. Peter Rassett
 George Lynn as Robert Kalnick (as George M. Lynn)
 Olan Soule as Mortie Fenton
 Anthony Warde as Arnie Molter

References

External links 
 
 
 
 
 

1952 films
1950s thriller films
American black-and-white films
American thriller films
Cold War films
Films about nuclear war and weapons
1950s English-language films
Films about child abduction in the United States
Films directed by Jerry Hopper
Films scored by Leith Stevens
Films set in New Mexico
Paramount Pictures films
1950s American films